Detrick Peak is a sharp peak, about  high, standing  east-southeast of Lutz Hill in the Kyle Hills, Ross Island. It was named by the Advisory Committee on Antarctic Names (2000) after Daniel L. Detrick, a physicist and engineer at the Institute for Physical Science and Technology, University of Maryland, who was involved in long-term ionospheric research with the United States Antarctic Program, including the design and fabrication, as well as deployment of instruments at McMurdo Station, South Pole Station, and Siple Station. He made more than a dozen visits to Antarctica from 1980.

References 

Mountains of Ross Island